Isca Marina is a locality which forms part of the commune of Isca sullo Ionio in the province of Catanzaro in the Calabria region of Italy.

Isca Marina is renowned for its white sandy beaches on Ionian sea in the Gulf of Squillace. 

Isca is five minutes away from the coastal resort of Soverato, where hospital, schooling and other services are provided.

External links 
 Isca Marina Community Website
 Isca Traditional Website
 

Cities and towns in Calabria